Nephelomilta is a monotypic moth genus in the subfamily Arctiinae. Its single species, Nephelomilta suffusa, is found in India's Nilgiri Mountains. Both the genus and species were first described by George Hampson; the genus in 1900 and the species in 1891.

References

External links

Nudariina
Moths of Asia
Monotypic moth genera